Harald Bernard Malmgren is a scholar, ambassador, and international negotiator who has been senior aide to US Presidents John F. Kennedy, Lyndon B. Johnson, Richard Nixon, and Gerald Ford, and to US Senators Abraham A. Ribicoff and Russell B. Long, United States Senate Committee on Finance. He has acted as an advisor to many foreign leaders and CEOs of financial institutions and corporate businesses and has been a frequent author of articles and papers on global economic, political, and security affairs.

Education 
Malmgren initially studied Physics at Rensselaer Polytechnic Institute, 1953–54. Offered a full scholarship to Yale University, he transferred to study economics, where he also became Research Assistant to Nobel Laureate Professor Thomas Schelling. In 1956 he was selected as Yale Scholar of the House for his senior year, graduating B.A summa cum laude from Yale University in 1957, and awarded Yale's Howland Fellowship for study and travel abroad.  Upon graduation from Yale Malmgren was invited by the Provost of Queen's College to study at the University of Oxford 1957–58. In autumn of 1958 he moved to Harvard University on invitation from the Dean of Graduate Studies, but returned to Oxford on his appointment as Student of Nuffield College, Oxford University, 1959–61 and Fellow of the Social Science Research Council, 1959–61. At Oxford he studied under Professor Sir John Hicks and was ultimately awarded degree of Doctor of Philosophy from Oxford in early 1962.

Scholarly Achievements 

During graduate studies at Oxford, Malmgren research was inspired by the historically important debate on markets vs. central planning between Ludwig von Mises and Oskar R. Lange, and by his subsequent personal interaction with Friedrich von Hayek and Oskar Lange. While writing his Doctoral thesis, Malmgren authored several theoretical papers which were published in major peer-reviewed academic journals, including an historically noted academic paper, "Information, Expectations, and the Theory of the Firm". That paper was republished in several collections of historically significant papers in economic science;  In this latter 2004 compendium of advances in institutional economics, composed of seven-volumes of historically important essays, the 1961 Malmgren paper is positioned chronologically as one of the first four classical foundation pieces from 1732 to 1961 underlying the emerging scholarly field "New Institutional Economics" which developed subsequently. This 1961 paper and Doctoral Dissertation were also given central attention in a recent historical analysis of the hundred years’ evolution of Oxford University economics and business studies from Alfred Marshall to the establishment of the Said School of Business at Oxford.

On the occasion of the retirement of Sir John Hicks from the Drummond Professorship of Economics at Oxford, an essay by Malmgren ("Information and Period Analysis in Economic Decisions") was included in a 1968 festschrift of papers of world recognized economists, including favorite students of Hicks, published as Value, Capital, and Growth, four years before Sir John Hicks was made Nobel Laureate in 1972.

During years of government service and later consultancy roles, Malmgren continued to write numerous peer-reviewed and popular articles in economics, military-security issues, agriculture, tax policy, technological change, geopolitics and other areas of contemporary public controversy. A list of his published books and monographs held by libraries listed in worldcat.org A select bibliography of the scholarly or peer-reviewed articles of H.B. Malmgren being assembled at https://independent.academia.edu/HaraldMalmgren.

Career 
At the start of his academic career Malmgren was appointed to the Galen Stone Joint Chair in Mathematical Economics in the Department of Engineering and in the College of Arts and Sciences, Cornell University, serving 1961–62.

In the summer of 1962 senior White House and Defense Department officials invited him to join the Administration of President John F. Kennedy. He moved to Washington, D.C., to join the Institute for Defense Analyses (advisers to the Office of the Secretary of Defense), serving as head of the Economics Group and as head of the Economics Group of the U.S. Joint Chiefs of Staff, Weapons Systems Evaluation Group (WSEG), in the Pentagon. He was known at that time as one of Defense Secretary Robert McNamara's "Whiz Kids."

In late 1964 he was asked by the President's National Security Adviser to join senior staff of the Office of the US Trade Representative (USTR), Executive Office of the President.  Initially he served as senior economist and Executive Assistant to the Special Representative Christian Herter (formerly Secretary of State, Governor of Massachusetts, and Member of Congress). In 1965 he was appointed as the first U.S. Assistant Special Representative for Trade Negotiations. (During this role He was also adjunct professor of economics, School of Advanced International Studies, Johns Hopkins University, 1967–69.) After resigning from USTR in mid-1969, he became director of research at the Overseas Development Council, 1969–71, Special Adviser to Senator Abraham A. Ribicoff and the Senate Finance Committee, 1970–71.and Adjunct Professor at Georgetown University, 1970–71.

In late 1971 President Richard Nixon asked Malmgren to serve as a special adviser on international economic policy, and in early 1972 appointed him Principal Deputy US Trade Representative, with the rank of Ambassador, and his appointment was confirmed by the United States Senate in February, 1972. He served in this role until mid-1975 when he resigned for family reasons.

In early 1972 Malmgren was designated by President Nixon to be the first US official to call for the creation of a Transpacific economic cooperation organization.  In 1973 at the behest of President Nixon and French President Pompidou, Malmgren worked directly with French Finance Minister Valéry Giscard d'Estaing to devise, and subsequently launch the Tokyo Round of world trade negotiations.

In 1974 Malmgren personally worked interactively with Senate Finance Committee Chairman Russell Long and Senator Herman Talmadge to draft the historically innovative "fast track trade negotiations" provision which became embodied in the Trade Act of 1974 – the first major revision of US trade law since the Reciprocal Trade Agreements Act of 1934.  When President Ford took office in 1974 he was also asked to add to his activities the role of special adviser on global economic and security issues to President Ford and to William Seidman, Assistant to the President for Economic Affairs.

Following public service, he was appointed as a Fellow of the Woodrow Wilson International Center for Scholars, Smithsonian Institution, 1975–76, and as an adviser to the Senate Finance Committee, 1976. In 1976–77 he returned to teaching as Professor of Business and Public Management at George Washington University.

From the late 1970s and early 1980s he joined the Board of Trustees of the Trade Policy Research Centre in London with fellow economists Sir Harry Johnson and Tadeusz Rybczynski; and he traveled and lectured with Herman Kahn (noted physicist and author of On Thermonuclear War, Thinking about the Unthinkable, etc.) in the US, Asia and Europe.

Role in U.S. policy debate 

While at the Institute for Defense Analyses and the Weapons Systems Evaluation Group of the Joint Chiefs of Staff he wrote several classified papers on thermonuclear war, NATO defenses, and US anti-missile technologies, and an unclassified paper on battlefield deployment of forces on the NATO central front, "A Forward-Pause Defense for Europe", Orbis (University of Pennsylvania), fall, 1964.  This article on history and contemporary relevance of static vs. fixed defense strategies generated much attention in the US Military and was reprinted in Military Review, the Professional Journal of the U.S. Army, in May 1965.

In 1972, in conjunction with The Atlantic Council, Malmgren published International Economic Peacekeeping in Phase II, which provided an outline of what the next phase of world trade negotiations should encompass, techniques and modalities for conducting such negotiations, and the special challenges for organization of national governments in addressing the international interaction of national laws, policies and regulatory practices. This book was also published in Japanese as The New International Round in 1973. It was utilized by many governments in Europe, Asia, and Latin America in the 1970s and 1980s as a manual for world trade deliberations and negotiations.

During the subsequent years of his business and financial consultancies, Malmgren also wrote numerous papers, articles, and chapters for publications of numerous scholars, National Academy of Sciences, The National Academy, The Royal Academy (UK), Royal Academy of Science (Sweden), Foreign Affairs, Foreign Policy, Europa Archiv, and his works have been frequently been translated into Japanese, Chinese, German, Korean, and Spanish.  Some of these published articles are currently being assembled and posted on www.academia.edu. He also made numerous presentations to Congressional Committees, Presidential Commissions, and Congressional and parliamentary conferences in Asia and Central Europe.

In the world of American jurisprudence Malmgren's exposition of the historic background and Congressional intent of key provisions of the Trade Act of 1974 was cited by the Supreme Court of the United States as explanatory basis of its historically significant trade policy determination in Zenith vs. US Treasury, 1978.

Malmgren is currently Contributing Editor to The International Economy.

Professional activities 

In 1977 he founded the Malmgren Group (international economic consultancy and advisory services on corporate and financial strategies to several CEOs of major US and foreign corporations and banks, and consultancy services to the European Union Commission), and in 1979 also founded the UK company, Malmgren, Golt & Kingston Ltd., 1979 to 1995, consultants to multinational companies, financial institutions, and the Commission of the European Union on European business and regulatory affairs. He continues today as President of Malmgren Global LLC, advisers to global financial institutions and sovereign wealth funds, and as special adviser to WS Wealth Management (Registered Investment Advisers).

In recent decades Malmgren served as strategist and risk advisor to many CEOs, CFOs, and CIOs in some of the world's biggest sovereign wealth funds, banks, insurers, asset managers, electronic trading platforms, stock exchanges, automotive and electronics manufacturers, and computer services enterprises in Asia, Europe and North America.  He has also been asked to brief many boards of directors.

In the mid-1980s former Japanese prime minister Takeo Fukuda asked Malmgren to serve as policy adviser to the Interaction Council, the independent association of former heads of government of all nations. He continued in this role with Fukuda's successor, Interaction Council Chairman Helmut Schmidt, former Chancellor of Germany.

Since the late 1960s Malmgren also acted as an adviser to Several Presidential Commissions, Special Adviser to the OECD Secretary General, the OECD's Wise Men's Group on Global Economic and Financial Reform, the Secretary General of the United Nations Conference on Trade and Development, and to several Heads of Government and other political leaders in Europe and Asia.  He was also Co-Founder with Former Secretary of State Lawrence Eagleburger of the Cordell Hull Institute in 1998, serving as its chairman until 2008.

Born in Boston in July, 1935, Malmgren has 6 children including Pippa Malmgren, and one grandchild. Harald Malmgren, the international Correspondence Chess Grandmaster of the mid-20th Century with the same name, was his father's brother.

References

External links
 http://www.haraldmalmgren.com/ Official Website
 https://www.academia.edu/HaraldMalmgren
 
 http://www.cordellhullinstitute.org
 
 
 
 
 
 https://www.loc.gov/resource/mfdip.2007mcc02/?sp=42
 https://www.loc.gov/resource/mfdip.2007mcc02/?sp=43&st=text

Living people
American chief executives of financial services companies
American economists
Yale University alumni
Cornell University faculty
Georgetown University faculty
George Washington University faculty
Johns Hopkins University faculty
Alumni of Nuffield College, Oxford
1935 births
Alumni of the University of Oxford